William Luke MM (17 December 1890 – January 1992) was an English professional footballer who played in the Football League for Preston North End as an outside right.

Personal life 
On 28 October 1915, over a year since the outbreak of the First World War, Luke enlisted in the Royal Field Artillery. He was deployed to the Western Front during the Battle of the Somme and participated in the battle's closing action on the Ancre in November 1916. Luke's unit moved to trench lines east of Arras in April 1917 and he was seriously wounded in the leg on 9 April, which led to his discharge from the army in August 1918. In the aftermath of his wounding, Luke was recommended for the Military Medal and the award was gazetted on 18 July 1917. At the time of his death in January 1992, Luke was the oldest-living former professional footballer in Britain.

Career statistics

Honours 
Preston North End
 Football League Second Division: 1911–12

References 

English Football League players
Association football outside forwards
Bedlington United A.F.C. players
English footballers
1890 births
1992 deaths
Footballers from Northumberland
Preston North End F.C. players
Hartlepool United F.C. players
British Army personnel of World War I
Royal Field Artillery soldiers
English centenarians
Men centenarians
Recipients of the Military Medal